Kenan Dervišagić (born 29 July 2000) is a Bosnian professional footballer who plays as a striker for Bosnian Premier League club Sarajevo.

Honours
Sarajevo 
Bosnian Cup: 2020–21

References

External links

2000 births
Living people
Sportspeople from Tuzla
Association football forwards
Bosnia and Herzegovina footballers
Bosnia and Herzegovina youth international footballers
FK Sarajevo players
FK Rudar Kakanj players
Premier League of Bosnia and Herzegovina players
First League of the Federation of Bosnia and Herzegovina players